"Dead Shrimp Blues" is a song written by Robert Johnson.

It is from the recording sessions of November 26 and 27, 1936, in San Antonio, Texas along with "32-20 Blues", "They're Red Hot", "Cross Road Blues", "Walkin' Blues", "Last Fair Deal Gone Down", "Preaching Blues" and "If I Had Possession Over Judgement Day".

References

Robert Johnson songs
Songs written by Robert Johnson
1937 songs
Song recordings produced by Don Law